iPBA is a television program that aired on Associated Broadcasting Company that serves as a sort of recap and analysis show reviewing the week's previous games in the Philippine Basketball Association, complete with top plays and special moments. The show was hosted by former Viva Hot Babes group member Asia Agcaoili.

See also
 Philippine Basketball Association
 Associated Broadcasting Company
 PBA on ABC

Philippine Basketball Association mass media
TV5 (Philippine TV network) original programming
2006 Philippine television series debuts
2007 Philippine television series endings
Philippine sports television series
Filipino-language television shows

References